Henry Reeve  may refer to:

 Henry Reeve (journalist) (1813–1895), English journalist
 Henry Reeve (soldier) (1850–1876), Cuban soldier
 Henry Reeve Brigade, Cuban disaster relief contingent of medical professionals

See also
 Henry Reeves (disambiguation)
Harry Reeve, boxer